Hannes Reinmayr (born 23 August 1969) is an Austrian former footballer who works as manager of SV Gössendorf.

Club career 
Born in Vienna, Reinmayr started his professional career at Austria Wien but did not managed to get playing time and moved to First Vienna in 1990. After a season at Stahl Linz he moved abroad to play for German clubs MSV Duisburg and Bayer Uerdingen before enjoying considerable successes in six years at Sturm Graz, winning two league titles and three domestic cups as well as playing two years in the UEFA Champions League group stages. He then played another half season in Germany before ending his pro career at SV Mattersburg.

He then became player and co-trainer at lowly SK St. Andrä.

International career 
He made his debut for Austria in an October 1993 World Cup qualification match against Israel and was a participant at the 1998 FIFA World Cup. He earned 14 caps, scoring four goals. His last international was the embarrassing 0–9 defeat by Spain in a European Championship qualification match in March 1999.

Honours 
 Austrian Football Bundesliga: 1997–98, 1998–99
 Austrian Cup: 1995–96, 1996–97, 1998–99

References

External links 
 Hannes Reinmayr at  Austria Archive 
 
 Bundesliga stats at Fussballportal 

1969 births
Living people
Footballers from Vienna
Association football forwards
Austrian footballers
Austria international footballers
1998 FIFA World Cup players
First Vienna FC players
MSV Duisburg players
KFC Uerdingen 05 players
SK Sturm Graz players
1. FC Saarbrücken players
SV Mattersburg players
Austrian Football Bundesliga players
Bundesliga players
2. Bundesliga players
Expatriate footballers in Germany
Austrian expatriate footballers
Austrian expatriate sportspeople in Germany